Raphaël Schellenberger (born February 14, 1990 in Mulhouse) is a French politician of The Republicans who has been serving as a member of the National Assembly of France since the 2017 elections, representing Haut-Rhin's 2nd constituency,

Political career
Schellenberger was elected to the National Assembly at the relatively young age of 27, having previously served as mayor of Wattwiller. In parliament, he serves on the Committee on Legal Affairs. In this capacity, he was the parliament's co-rapporteur (alongside Bruno Questel) on territorial reforms in 2019. From 2018 until 2020, he was also a member of the Committee on Sustainable Development and Spatial Planning.

In addition to his committee assignments, Schellenberger is part of the French-Austrian Parliamentary Friendship Group. Since 2019, he has also been a member of the French delegation to the Franco-German Parliamentary Assembly.

In 2018, the Republicans' chair Laurent Wauquiez included Schellenberger in his shadow cabinet.

Political positions
In July 2019, Schellenberger voted against the French ratification of the European Union’s Comprehensive Economic and Trade Agreement (CETA) with Canada.

References

1990 births
Living people
Politicians from Mulhouse
The Republicans (France) politicians
Deputies of the 15th National Assembly of the French Fifth Republic
Mayors of places in Grand Est
Deputies of the 16th National Assembly of the French Fifth Republic